SCE is an abbreviation with multiple meanings:

Science
 Short-channel effect, a secondary effect describing the reduction in threshold voltage Vth in MOSFETs with non-uniformly doped channel regions as the gate length increases
 Saturated calomel electrode, a commonly used reference electrode used in pH measurement and general aqueous electrochemistry
 Subcutaneous emphysema, air trapped in the subcutaneous layer of the tissues
 Sister chromatid exchange, the exchange of genetic material between two identical sister chromatids

Education
 Scottish Certificate of Education was a certificate of the Scottish Secondary Education system incorporating Standard and Higher Grades
 Sami Shamoon College of Engineering, a STEM-oriented college in southern Israel
 School of Continuing Education, an adult continuing education school in Orange County, California
 School of Continuing Education, Hong Kong Baptist University, one of the seven schools of the Hong Kong Baptist University
 Service Children's Education, a support agency acting as a Local Education Authority for British service schools overseas

Computing
 System Center Essentials, a performance and event monitoring product from Microsoft
 Service Creation Environment, a development environment used to create the services present in an Intelligent Network
 Scalable Cluster Environment, a software project for cluster computing
Sony Interactive Entertainment, formerly named Sony Computer Entertainment

Organisations
Southern California Edison, primary electricity supplier for southern California, USA.
China SCE Property, a property developer in Fujian, China
Sony Computer Entertainment, a former video game division within Sony Corporation
Singapore Combat Engineers, one of the combat arms of the Singapore Armed Forces
Saudi Council of Engineers
Societas cooperativa Europaea (Latin for European Cooperative Society, a European legal society for companies or individuals from different EU states

Other
 Starfleet Corps of Engineers, a series of books from the fictional Star Trek universe
 University Park Airport, an airport in State College, Pennsylvania with IATA code "SCE"
 Swedish Cyprus Expedition, a project to systematically investigate the archaeology of the early history of Cyprus.